The Sarai Kale Khan - Nizamuddin metro station is located on the Pink Line of the Delhi Metro. It was opened on 31 December 2018 as part of Phase III of Delhi Metro.

It is situated on the ring road and serves the Hazrat Nizamuddin railway station, Sarai Kale Khan Inter-State Bus Terminus (ISBT) and its surrounding area of Sarai Kale Khan and Nizamuddin East and West. The place is surrounded by many shops for eating street food and restaurants naf hostels to stay for a single night.

Earlier, the name of the station was Hazrat Nizamuddin, and it was changed to Sarai Kale Khan - Nizamuddin in 2019.

The station

Station layout

Entry/Exit

 GATE 1 →  Sarai Kale Khan Inter-State Bus Terminus (ISBT)
 GATE 2 →  Hazrat Nizamuddin railway station
 GATE 3 →  Hazrat Nizamuddin railway station

Connections

Bus
Delhi Transport Corporation bus routes number 0OMS (+), 0TMS (+), 243, 306, 311A, 469, 473, 473A, 473CL, 492, 534, 534A, 534C, 542, 0543A, 543A, 543STL, 567, 611, 611A, 611B, 702, 711, 711A, 864, AC – Anand Vihar ISBT Terminal – Gurugram Bus Stand, AC-534, AC-711, Anand Vihar ISBT Terminal – Gurugram Bus Stand, Ballabgarh Bus Stand – Panipat, Ballabgarh Bus Stand – Sonipat, OMS (+), OMS (+) AC, TMS (+), TMS+AL, TMS+Punjabi Bagh, serves the station.

Sarai Kale Khan Inter-State Bus Terminus (ISBT)

Rail
Hazrat Nizamuddin railway station of Indian Railways situated nearby.

See also

Delhi
List of Delhi Metro stations
Transport in Delhi
Delhi Metro Rail Corporation
Delhi Suburban Railway
Inner Ring Road, Delhi
Delhi Monorail
Delhi Transport Corporation
South Delhi
Sarai Kale Khan
New Delhi
National Capital Region (India)
List of rapid transit systems
List of metro systems

References

External links

 Delhi Metro Rail Corporation Ltd. (Official site)
 Delhi Metro Annual Reports
 
 UrbanRail.Net – Descriptions of all metro systems in the world, each with a schematic map showing all stations.

Delhi Metro stations
Railway stations in South East Delhi district